Leucanopsis dogniniana is a moth of the subfamily Arctiinae. It was described by Strand in 1919. It is found in Colombia.

References

dogniniana
Moths described in 1919